The Chinese Cereals and Oils Association (CCOA) is a national scientific and technical association for the cereals, oils, fats and feed producing industry.

History 

The Chinese Cereals and Oils Association was established in 1986.

Description 
The Chinese Cereals and Oils Association (CCOA) is a national scientific and technical association for the cereals, oils, fats and feed producing industry.

CCOA is member of CAST (China Association for Science and Technology) and has close relations with the Ministry of Commerce, which controls most of the cereals, oils and fats and the feed industry in China.

The Chinese cereal and oil and baking industry produces more than 34% of the total production value of the whole food industry. Cereal, oil and feed is one of the most important sectors in the Chinese food industry.

References

External links
 http://www.chinagrain.gov.cn/english/General%20Situation5.html

Trade associations based in China